The Articularis cubiti muscle is a muscle of the elbow.

It is considered by some sources to be a part of the triceps brachii muscle.

It is also known as the "subanconeus muscle", for its relationship to the anconeus muscle.

It is classified as a muscle of the posterior brachium.

References

Muscles of the upper limb